"Blue Fear" is an instrumenal composition by Dutch disc jockey and producer Armin. It was initially released on 13 October 1997 as 12" vinyl in the Netherlands by Cyber Records. It is the first track from Armin van Buuren which reached a significant success. The single was rereleased on 16 August 2004 by Nebula as the fourth single from Armin's first studio album, 76.

Background and release 
At the moment of the release of the track, van Buuren was 19 years old and he was still living with his parents in Leiden. He created "Blue Fear" in his bedroom with a sampler bought with his own pocket money. In 2020, during an episode of A State of Trance, van Buuren explained to Ruben de Ronde the context of production of the track : “I was bullied by a couple of guys and i was afraid to go outside, so i was afraid of the ‘blue’, afraid of the light of the blue skies. I got over that, thank god, but yeah... That's the true story.”

Music video 
A music video was realised by Ciro Ayala with the actress Calina Chan for the track 12 years after its official release. It was published on 23 November 2009 by Armada Music's Youtube channel.

Track listing 
Netherlands - 12" - Cyber 
 "Blue Fear" – 7:58
 "X Marks the Spot" – 7:37
 "Archeae From Space" - 8:21

UK - CD - Xtravaganza 
 "Blue Fear" (Radio Edit) – 3:42
 "Blue Fear" (Extended Version) – 8:06
 "X Marks the Spot" – 7:37
 "Archeae From Space" – 8:27

UK - 12" - Xtravaganza 
 "Blue Fear" (Extended Version) – 7:58
 "X Marks the Spot" – 7:37
 "Archeae From Space" – 8:21

Trouser Enthusiasts Mixes - UK - CD - Xtravaganza 
 "Blue Fear" (Trouser Enthusiasts Edit) – 3:59
 "Blue Fear" (Trouser Enthusiasts E.B.E. Mix) – 9:01
 "Blue Fear" (Trouser Enthusiasts E.B.E. Instrumental)  – 9:02
 "Blue Fear" (Original Extended Version) – 8:06

Trouser Enthusiasts Mix - UK - 12" - Xtravaganza 
 "Blue Fear" (Trouser Enthusiasts E.B.E. Mix) – 8:59
 "Blue Fear" (Original Extended Version) – 7:57

Germany - 12" - Bionic Beat 
 "Blue Fear"  – 7:58
 "Blue Fear" (Chuck Mellow Remix) – 7:05
 "X Marks the Spot" – 7:37

"Blue Fear 2004" - UK - CD & Digital download - Nebula 
 "Blue Fear" (Original 2003 Edit) – 2:39
 "Blue Fear" (Original 2003 Mix) – 9:30
 "Blue Fear" (Solid Globe 2004 Remix) – 7:33
 "Blue Fear" (Agnelli & Nelson 2004 Remix) – 9:52
 "Blue Fear" (Scott Mac New Fear 2004 Remix) – 8:56

"Blue Fear 2004" - UK - 12" - Nebula 
 "Blue Fear" (Original 2003 Mix) – 9:30
 "Blue Fear" (Solid Globe 2004 Remix) – 7:33

"Blue Fear 2004" (Remixes) - UK - 12" - Nebula 
 "Blue Fear" (Agnelli & Nelson 2004 Remix) – 9:52
 "Blue Fear" (Scott Mac New Fear 2004 Remix) – 8:56

2006 Re-issue - Netherlands - Digital download - Armada digital 
 "Blue Fear 2003" – 7:33
 "Blue Fear" (Agnelli & Nelson Remix) – 9:56
 "Blue Fear" (Solid Globe Remix)  – 7:37
 "Blue Fear" (Scott Mac Remix) – 8:56

Eelke Kleijn Mixes - Netherlands - Digital download - Armind 
 "Blue Fear" (Eelke Kleijn Extended Day Mix) – 7:33
 "Blue Fear" (Eelke Kleijn Extended Night Mix) – 7:57

Charts

Blue Fear

Blue Fear 2004

References 

1997 songs
1997 singles
2004 singles
Armin van Buuren songs
Songs written by Armin van Buuren
Armada Music singles